Raymond LaRose (born November 20, 1941) is a Canadian former professional ice hockey defenceman who played parts of two seasons in the World Hockey Association (WHA) for the Houston Aeros and New York Golden Blades/Jersey Knights.

References

External links
 

1941 births
Living people
Canadian expatriate ice hockey players in the United States
Canadian ice hockey defencemen
Denver Spurs (WHL) players
Houston Aeros (WHA) players
Kansas City Blues players
Los Angeles Blades (WHL) players
New York Golden Blades players
Jersey Knights players
Quebec Aces (AHL) players
Seattle Totems (WHL) players
St. Louis Braves players
Syracuse Blazers players